Hans Werckmeister (1879 - 4 July 1929) was a German film director. He is best known for his film Algol.

Selected filmography
 The Golden Net (1922)
 The Affair of Baroness Orlovska (1923)
 The Brigantine of New York (1924)

References

External links
 

1879 births
1929 deaths
Film directors from Berlin